Georgia State Route 8 Spur may refer to:

 Georgia State Route 8 Spur (Decatur): a former spur route of State Route 8 that existed mostly within Decatur
 Georgia State Route 8 Spur (Hartwell): a former spur route of State Route 8 that partially existed in Hartwell
 Georgia State Route 8 Spur (Royston): a former spur route of State Route 8 that existed entirely within Royston

008 Spur